Valliquerville is a commune in the Seine-Maritime department in the Normandy region in northern France.

Geography

History 
In the late eleventh century the village was in the possession of Bec Abbey.

In May 1592, Henry IV and his forces were encamped in the village during the French Wars of Religion.

In April 1940, during World War II Princess Louise's Kensington Regiment was billeted in the village as part of the British Expeditionary Force.

Heraldry

Population

Places of interest
 The church of Notre-Dame, dating from the thirteenth century. Its Gothic tower dates from the sixteenth century. It has been restored after being in a state of disrepair in the mid nineteenth century.

See also
Communes of the Seine-Maritime department

References

Communes of Seine-Maritime